The Samadhi of Ranjit Singh (ਰਣਜੀਤ ਸਿੰਘ ਦੀ ਸਮਾਧੀ) is a 19th-century building in Lahore, Pakistan that houses the funerary urns of the Sikh Maharaja Ranjit Singh (1780 – 1839). It is located adjacent the Lahore Fort and Badshahi Mosque, as well as the Gurdwara Dera Sahib, which marks the spot where the fifth guru of Sikhism, Guru Arjan Dev, died. Its construction was started by his son and successor, Maharaja Kharak Singh, after the ruler's death in 1839, and completed nine years later. It overlooks the Hazuri Bagh, built by Ranjit Singh, to its south.

History

Construction of the building was started by his son, Kharak Singh  on the spot where he was cremated, and was completed by his youngest son, Duleep Singh in 1848.

Modern era
The funerary urns were removed from the marble pavilion and were replaced by a simple slab around 1999. This was done as part of the preparations for the Khalsa Tricentenary and the visit of Sikh dignitaries from India. It has been kept well by Pakistani government. The Samadhi was damaged by an earthquake in 2005 but was repaired soon.

Architecture

Building
The building combines elements of Sikh, Hindu, and Islamic architecture. Portions of the building are believed to have been plundered from the adjacent Lahore Fort.

The building has gilded fluted domes and cupolas, and an ornate balustrade around the upper portion of the building. The front of the doorway has images of Ganesh, Devi and Brahma that are cut from red sandstone. The dome is decorated with Naga (serpent) hood designs - the product of Hindu craftsmen that worked on the project. The wooden panels on the ceiling are decorated with stained glass work, while the walls are richly decorated with floral designs. The ceilings are decorated with glass mosaic work.

Funerary urns
Ranjit Singh's ashes are contained in a marble urn in the shape of a lotus, sheltered under a marble pavilion inlaid with pietra dura, in the centre of the tomb.  Surrounding him, in smaller urns, are the ashes of four sati queens and seven concubines.

Associated monuments
 
Two small monuments to the west of the main building commemorate Maharaja Ranjit Singh's son Maharaja Kharak Singh and grandson Nau Nihal Singh, along with their wives. The building is located adjacent to Gurdwara Dera Sahib, the place where martyrdom of Guru Arjun took place.

Gallery

See also

Ranjit Singh
Sikh Empire
 Evacuee Trust Property Board
List of mausolea
Walled City of Lahore

References

External links

A photo of the tomb
An older photo of the samadhi
The Latest News on the Heritage of the Punjab

Architecture of Lahore
Buildings and structures in Lahore
Sikh Empire
Sikh architecture
Sikhism in Lahore
Walled City of Lahore
Tourist attractions in Lahore
Shrines in Lahore
Samadhis
Sikh places
Ranjit Singh